Adam Silvera (born June 7, 1990) is an American author of young adult fiction novels, known for his bestselling novels They Both Die at the End, More Happy Than Not, and History Is All You Left Me.

Life and career
Adam Silvera was born and raised in the South Bronx in New York City. His mother, Persi Rosa, is Puerto Rican and a social worker. Silvera started writing when he was around 10 or 11, initially working on fan fiction.

Silvera has worked as a barista, bookseller, and reviewer for Shelf Awareness before becoming a published writer. Silvera is open about his struggles with depression and revealed he has been diagnosed with borderline personality disorder. He is gay.

Silvera's first novel, More Happy Than Not, was published in published June 2, 2015 by Soho Teen. The book is a New York Times best seller and was shortlisted for the Lambda Literary Award for Children's and Young Adult Literature. As of 2020, HBO Max was developing More Happy Than Not as a one-hour series, with Drew Comins and Silvera serving as executive producers on the project.

His second novel, History Is All You Left Me, was published January 17, 2017 by Soho Teen. The same year, They Both Die at the End was published by HarperTeen on September 5, 2017. Originally optioned by HBO in 2019 to be developed into a series written by Chris Kelly and executive produced by J.J. Abrams, Adam Silvera has since announced he will be serving as creator, screenwriter, and executive producer for a TV series adaptation of his novel They Both Die at the End.

Silvera's fourth novel, What If It's Us, was co-authored with Becky Albertalli and published in 2018 by HarperTeen. Movie rights to the book sold to Anonymous Content in 2018, with Brian Yorkey as the screenwriter.

Silvera's Infinity Cycle fantasy series began with Infinity Son, published in 2020.

In June 2020, in honor of the 50th anniversary of the first LGBTQ Pride parade, Queerty named Silvera among the fifty heroes "leading the nation toward equality, acceptance, and dignity for all people".

Publications

Novels

Standalone books 
 More Happy Than Not (SoHo Teen, 2015)
 More Happy Ending - a deluxe edition of More Happy Than Not which includes an additional final chapter, a foreword by Angie Thomas and an afterword by Silvera (2020)
 History Is All You Left Me (SoHo Teen, 2017)

Death-Cast series 
 They Both Die at the End (HarperTeen, 2017)
 The First to Die at the End (2022)

What If It's Us series 
 What If It's Us, co-authored with Becky Albertalli (HarperTeen, 2018)
 Here's To Us, co-authored with Becky Albertalli (HarperTeen/Balzer + Bray, 2021)

The Infinity Cycle series 
 Infinity Son (2020)
 Infinity Reaper (2021)
 Untitled sequel (2023)

Short stories

 Because You Love to Hate Me: 13 Tales of Villainy (contributing writer) (Bloomsbury, 2017)
 (Don't) Call Me Crazy (contributing writer) (Algonquin, 2018)
 Color Outside the Lines (SoHo Teen, 2019)

References

External links

Living people
21st-century American novelists
American gay writers
21st-century Puerto Rican writers
Writers from the Bronx
1990 births
21st-century LGBT people
21st-century American male writers
American male novelists
People with borderline personality disorder
Novelists from New York (state)